Chester Bennett Bowen (April 1, 1842 – March 16, 1905) was a Union soldier during the American Civil War. He received the Medal of Honor for gallantry during the Battle of Opequon more commonly called the Third Battle of Winchester, Virginia on September 19, 1864. Corporal Bowen was one of two members of the 1st New York Dragoons to receive the Medal of Honor for this action. The other was Sgt. Andrew J. Lorish.

Medal of Honor citation
"The President of the United States of America, in the name of Congress, takes pleasure in presenting the Medal of Honor to Corporal Chester Bennett Bowen, United States Army, for extraordinary heroism on 19 September 1864, while serving with Company I, 19th New York Cavalry (1st New York Dragoons), in action at Winchester, Virginia, for capture of flag."

Action Date: September 19, 1864
Service: Army
Rank: Corporal
Company: Company I
Division: 1st New York Dragoons (19th NY Cavalry)

The flag that was captured by Bowen was a CSA second national flag belonging to an unidentified unit in Col George S. Patton's Virginia Infantry Brigade. The flag is now in the possession of the Museum of the Confederacy in Richmond, Virginia.

See also

List of Medal of Honor recipients
List of American Civil War Medal of Honor recipients: A–F

Notes

References

External links
Military Times Hall of Valor

1842 births
1905 deaths
People from Nunda, New York
People of New York (state) in the American Civil War
Union Army soldiers
United States Army Medal of Honor recipients
American Civil War recipients of the Medal of Honor